Veerapandi S Arumugam (26 January 1937 – 23 November 2012) was a Tamil Nadu politician.  He was born to Solai Goundar in Poolavari, Salem.

He died on 23 November 2012 in Chennai due to illness.

Political career 
Arumugam first became a Dravida Munnetra Kazhagam member in 1957. He has for decades been the face of the DMK in the Salem region. He held the Veerapandi Assembly seat with a vise-like grip, suffering his biggest loss there in the last election he contested.

In his early age he was inspired by the writings and speeches of the late Chief Minister and DMK founder C. N. Annadurai and party chief M Karunanidhi, Arumugam plunged into politics when he was 14. He was elected to the Tamil Nadu Legislative Assembly five times. Arumugam was among the few non-founding leaders in the DMK, who enjoyed unquestioned respect and stature, holding the key to a section of the voters of the Vanniyar community, to which he belonged. He also served as the Minister for Rural Development and Local Administration and the Minister for Agriculture.

References

Dravida Munnetra Kazhagam politicians
Tamil Nadu ministers
1937 births
People from Salem district
2012 deaths
Madras MLAs 1962–1967
Tamil Nadu MLAs 1967–1972
Tamil Nadu MLAs 1971–1976
Tamil Nadu MLAs 1996–2001